{{Infobox beauty pageant
| theme = Raise Your Flag
| image = Gazini Ganados in Bulwagang Katipunan on September 3, 2019.jpg
| image size = 200px
| caption = Gazini Ganados, Miss Universe Philippines 2019
| date = June 9, 2019
| presenters = 
| entertainment =  
| venue = Smart Araneta Coliseum, Quezon City, Metro Manila, Philippines
| broadcaster = ABS-CBN
| congeniality = Marie Sherry Ann Tormes Polangui, Albay
| best national costume = Emma Mary Tiglao  Pampanga
| photogenic = Gazini Christiana Jordi Ganados   Talisay, Cebu
| entrants = 40
| placements = 25
| winner = Gazini Christiana Jordi Ganados
| represented = Talisay, Cebu| before = 2018
| next = 2021
}}Binibining Pilipinas 2019''' was the 56th edition of Binibining Pilipinas. It was held at the Smart Araneta Coliseum in Quezon City, Metro Manila, Philippines on June 9, 2019.

At the end of the event, Catriona Gray crowned Gazini Ganados as Miss Universe Philippines 2019, Maria Ahtisa Manalo crowned Bea Magtanong as Binibining Pilipinas International 2019, Jehza Huelar crowned Resham Saeed as Binibining Pilipinas Supranational 2019, Karen Gallman crowned Emma Tiglao as Binibining Pilipinas Intercontinental 2019, Eva Psyche Patalinjug crowned Samantha Lo as Binibining Pilipinas Grand International 2019, and Michele Gumabao crowned Leren Bautista as Binibining Pilipinas Globe 2019. Maria Andrea Abesamis was named 1st Runner-Up, while Samantha Bernardo was named 2nd Runner-Up.

Maria Andrea Abesamis took over the Binibining Pilipinas-Grand International 2019 title after Samantha Lo's resignation to the title on November 27, 2019. Furthermore, 2nd Runner-Up Samantha Bernardo is appointed as Binibining Pilipinas Grand International 2020.

The 2019 edition also marks the first time Binibining Pilipinas Charities, Inc. (BPCI) collaborated with the newly established Miss Universe Philippines Organization, owned by the LCS Group, which incited new changes and upgrades to the pre-pageant activities, coordinations and the pageant itself.

This is also the last year of Miss Universe Philippines and Miss Supranational Philippines titles to be under Binibining Pilipinas after the franchises of Miss Universe Philippines and Miss Supranational Philippines were transferred to the Miss Universe Philippines Organization and the Miss World Philippines Organization respectively.

Results
Color keys
  The contestant was a Runner-up in an International pageant.
  The contestant was a Semi-Finalist in an International pageant.
  The contestant did not place.

Special awards

Judges 
 James Reid – Actor, Performer, Producer
 Bobby Barreiro – Head of Integrated Events & Customer Engagement for ABS-CBN
 Brian Cu – President of Grab Philippines
 Nadine Lustre – Actress & Performer
 Giorgio Guglielmino – Italian Ambassador to the Philippines
 Christian Standhardinger – Filipino-German Professional Basketball Player
 Rainerio Borja – President of Asian Region for Alorica
 Gloria Diaz — Actress & Miss Universe 1969 from the Philippines
 Daniel Padilla – Actor & Performer
 Jorge Moragas – Spanish Ambassador to the Philippines
 Joy Belmonte — Mayor-elect of Quezon City and Chairwoman of Board of Judges

Contestants 
40 contestants competed for the six titles. For the first time in Binibining Pilipinas, the candidates will represent some of the provinces, cities and municipalities, and a region of the Philippines.

Notes

Post-pageant Notes 

 Gazini Ganados competed at Miss Universe 2019 in Atlanta, Georgia, finishing as a Top 20 semifinalist. Aside from that, Ganados also bagged the Best in National Costume award.
 Bea Magtanong competed at Miss International 2019 in Tokyo, Japan, where she finished as a Top 8 finalist. On the other hand, Resham Saeed finished as a Top 25 semifinalist when she competed at Miss Supranational 2019 in Silesia, Poland.
 Samantha Lo competed at Miss Grand International 2019 in Venezuela, but was unplaced. A month after her international pageant, Lo resigned as Binibining Pilipinas Grand International 2019.
 Emma Tiglao competed at Miss Intercontinental 2019 in Egypt where she finished as a Top 20 semifinalist. Aside from finishing as a Top 20 semifinalist, Tiglao also bagged the Miss Popularity and Miss May Care awards.
 Leren Bautista competed at The Miss Globe 2019 pageant in Ulcinj, Montenegro where she finished as Second Runner-Up. After her stint at Binibining Pilipinas, Bautista competed at Miss Universe Philippines 2021 where she finished as a Top 10 finalist.
 Samantha Bernardo was supposed to compete at Binibining Pilipinas 2021 but was appointed as Binibining Pilipinas Grand International 2020 since Maria Andrea Abesamis could not compete due to age restrictions. Bernardo competed at Miss Grand International 2020 where she finished as First Runner-Up. Bernardo was also one of the Top 10 at the National Costume competition of the pageant.
 Hannah Arnold competed at Binibining Pilipinas 2021 where she was crowned Binibining Pilipinas International 2021. Arnold competed at the Miss International 2022 pageant where she finished as a Top 15 semifinalist.

References

2019 beauty pageants
2019 in the Philippines
2019